The 1952 Allan Cup was the Canadian senior ice hockey championship for the 1951–52 senior "A" season.  The event was hosted by the Fort Frances Canadians and Fort Frances, Ontario.  The 1952 playoff marked the 44th time that the Allan Cup has been awarded.

Teams
Stratford Indians (Eastern Canadian Champions)
Fort Frances Canadians (Western Canadian Champions)

Playdowns

Allan Cup Best-of-Seven Series
Fort Frances Canadians defeated Stratford Indians 4-games-to-2
Fort Frances Canadians 9 - Stratford Indians 5
Stratford Indians 3 - Fort Frances Canadians 0
Fort Frances Canadians 6 - Stratford Indians 5
Fort Frances Canadians 5 - Stratford Indians 3
Stratford Indians 2 - Fort Frances Canadians 1
Fort Frances Canadians 4 - Stratford Indians 1

Eastern Playdowns
Quarter-final
Pembroke Lumber Kings defeated St. Francis Xavier X-Men 3-games-to-none with 1 tie
Pembroke Lumber Kings 4 - St. Francis Xavier Xmen 3
Pembroke Lumber Kings 3 - St. Francis Xavier Xmen 3
Pembroke Lumber Kings 8 - St. Francis Xavier Xmen 1
Pembroke Lumber Kings 3 - St. Francis Xavier Xmen 2
Semi-final
Stratford Indians defeated Sault Ste. Marie Greyhounds 4-games-to-none with 1 tie
Stratford Indians 2 - Sault Ste. Marie Greyhounds 2
Stratford Indians 4 - Sault Ste. Marie Greyhounds 3
Stratford Indians 4 - Sault Ste. Marie Greyhounds 3
Stratford Indians 5 - Sault Ste. Marie Greyhounds 2
Stratford Indians 5 - Sault Ste. Marie Greyhounds 2
Pembroke Lumber Kings defeated Jonquiere Aces 3-games-to-1
Pembroke Lumber Kings 3 - Jonquiere Aces 2
Jonquiere Aces 5 - Pembroke Lumber Kings 3
Pembroke Lumber Kings 4 - Jonquiere Aces 3
Pembroke Lumber Kings 7 - Jonquiere Aces 3
Final
Stratford Indians defeated Pembroke Lumber Kings 4-games-to-1
Stratford Indians 5 - Pembroke Lumber Kings 3
Stratford Indians 3 - Pembroke Lumber Kings 0
Pembroke Lumber Kings 7 - Stratford Indians 4
Stratford Indians 7 - Pembroke Lumber Kings 5
Stratford Indians 6 - Pembroke Lumber Kings 4

Western Playdowns
Quarter-final
Edmonton Pats defeated Melville Millionaires 4-games-to-none
Edmonton Pats 5 - Melville Millionaires 0
Edmonton Pats 6 - Melville Millionaires 3
Edmonton Pats 5 - Melville Millionaires 3
Edmonton Pats 4 - Melville Millionaires 1
Semi-final
Edmonton Pats defeated Trail Smoke Eaters 4-games-to-2
Edmonton Pats 5 - Trail Smoke Eaters 2
Trail Smoke Eaters 4 - Edmonton Pats 2
Edmonton Pats 4 - Trail Smoke Eaters 2
Edmonton Pats 4 - Trail Smoke Eaters 2
Trail Smoke Eaters 5 - Edmonton Pats 4
Edmonton Pats 2 - Trail Smoke Eaters 1
Fort Frances Canadians defeated Letellier Maple Leafs 4-games-to-2 with 1 tie
Fort Frances Canadians 7 - Letellier Maple Leafs 2
Fort Frances Canadians 4 - Letellier Maple Leafs 4
Fort Frances Canadians 10 - Letellier Maple Leafs 3
Letellier Maple Leafs 5 - Fort Frances Canadians 2
Letellier Maple Leafs 2 - Fort Frances Canadians 1
Fort Frances Canadians 8 - Letellier Maple Leafs 2
Fort Frances Canadians 5 - Letellier Maple Leafs 4
Final
Fort Frances Canadians defeated Edmonton Pats 4-games-to-1 with 1 tie
Fort Frances Canadians 3 - Edmonton Pats 3
Fort Frances Canadians 6 - Edmonton Pats 5
Edmonton Pats 4 - Fort Frances Canadians 2
Fort Frances Canadians 7 - Edmonton Pats 1
Fort Frances Canadians 7 - Edmonton Pats 1
Fort Frances Canadians 5 - Edmonton Pats 3

References
Allan Cup archives

External links
Allan Cup website

1951–52 in Canadian ice hockey
Allan Cup